Day One may refer to:

Film and television
 Day One (1989 film), a 1989 television film
 Day One, also known as To Write Love on Her Arms, a 2012 drama film
 Day One (2015 film), a 2015 short film
 Day One (TV series), a 2009 American television pilot for NBC which was reduced from a television series to a television film, but which never aired
 Day One (TV program), an American news magazine program that ran from 1993 to 1995 on ABC
 "Day One" (Torchwood), a 2006 episode of the science-fiction television series Torchwood
 The first episode of the 2009 Torchwood serial Children of Earth
 Day One, the first season of the television series 24
 Day One, the second episode of the first season of the medical drama ER
 WWE Day 1, a 2022 professional wrestling event

Music 
 Day One (band), an English trip hop band
 Day One (Birds of Tokyo album), a 2007 album by Birds of Tokyo
 Day One (From Ashes To New album), a 2016 album by From Ashes To New
 Day One (Sarah Slean album), a 2004 album by Sarah Slean
 Day One (Snob Scrilla album), a 2009 album by Snob Scrilla
 Day 1 (album), a 1991 album by Robbie Nevil
 "Day 1" (song), a song by Leslie Grace
 "Day One", a 2015 song by Chris Brown from Royalty

Video games
 Half-Life: Day One, a Half-Life demo
 Day One: Garry's Incident, a video game by Wild Games Studio''
 Day 1 Studios, an American videogame developer

Other
 Day One (app), a personal journaling app for iOS, macOS and Android
 Day One (building), part of Amazon.com's downtown Seattle corporate headquarters
 Day One Christian Ministries, an organisation promoting Sunday as a day of rest, formerly known as the Lord's Day Observation Society (LDOS)